In mathematics, Topological Hochschild homology is a topological refinement of Hochschild homology which rectifies some technical issues with computations in characteristic . In contrast, the Topological Hochschild Homology ring has the isomorphism  giving a less pathological theory. Moreover, this calculation forms the basis of many other THH calculations, such as for smooth algebras

Construction 
Recall that the Eilenberg–MacLane spectrum can be embed ring objects in the derived category of the integers  into ring spectrum over the ring spectrum of the stable homotopy group of spheres. This makes it possible to take a commutative ring  and constructing a complex analogous to the Hochschild complex using the monoidal product in ring spectra, namely,  acts formally like the derived tensor product  over the integers. Because simplicial objects in spectra have a realization as a spectrum, we form the spectrumwhich has homotopy groups  defining the topological Hochschild homology of the ring object .

See also 

 Revisiting THH(F_p)
 Topological cyclic homology of the integers

Homological algebra
Algebraic topology